Christian Alejandro Pérez Vázquez (born 27 March 1990) is a Mexican footballer who plays as a centre-back for Cafetaleros Tapachula.

Career
Christian Perez debuted with Chivas on 5 February 2010 in a match against Querétaro FC, corresponding to Week 4 of the Bicentenario tournament in the 89th minute, replacing Alberto Medina.

He has also participated with the Mexico national football team in its lower divisions, with the U17 National Team three times in 2007.

Honours
Cafetaleros
Ascenso MX: Clausura 2018

Chapulineros de Oaxaca
Liga de Balompié Mexicano: 2021

References

External links
 
 

1990 births
Living people
Mexican footballers
Footballers from Guadalajara, Jalisco
C.D. Guadalajara footballers
Querétaro F.C. footballers
Liga MX players
Association football defenders
Ascenso MX players
Liga de Balompié Mexicano players